Vade may refer to:
Little Norway, California
Phillips, California